The 2013–14 Georgia State Panthers men's basketball team represented Georgia State University during the 2013–14 NCAA Division I men's basketball season. The team's head coach was Ron Hunter serving his third season at GSU. The Panthers played their home games at the GSU Sports Arena competing as members of the Sun Belt Conference. They finished the season 25–9, 17–1 in Sun Belt play to win the Sun Belt regular season championship, advancing to the championship game of the Sun Belt Conference tournament where they lost to Louisiana–Lafayette. As a regular season conference champion who failed to win their conference tournament, they received an automatic bid to the National Invitation Tournament where they lost in the first round to Clemson.

Season notes
This is the Panthers first year in the Sun Belt Conference since leaving in 1981.
Despite playing at Kentucky during the 2012–2013 season, guard, Ryan Harrow, was granted an NCAA waiver to play immediately at Georgia State due to hardship resulting from his father, who resides in Atlanta, having a stroke prior to the 2012–2013 season.
Curtis Washington tied the school record for blocked shots in a single game, tying 3 ways at 9 with Sylvester Morgan and James Vincent during the season opener on November 9 against Southern Poly.
R. J. Hunter broke his own record for 3-pointers made in a single game at 12 on December 22 against UTSA. His previous record was 10 the previous season vs. Old Dominion.
R. J. Hunter also broke the record for 3-pointers attempted in a single game at 19 on December 22 against UTSA.
The team broke the record for free throws made in a single game, making a perfect 22 of 22 on the January 9th game against Western Kentucky. This was also a record for the E. A. Diddle Arena, Western Kentucky's home arena.
R. J. Hunter took the record for consecutive free throws made, ending with his 38th straight during the January 14th game against Louisiana.
The 10-0 conference start ending against UALR was the first time that the Panthers have gone  undefeated in conference for 10 games.
Georgia State made a new win streak record, making 14 straight starting against ODU on December 14, 2013, and ending on February 6 against UALR.
Due to inclement weather conditions throughout the state of Georgia, the home game against South Alabama was moved from Thursday, January 30 to Monday, February 3.
Due to inclement weather conditions, the home game against Texas State was moved from Thursday, February 13 to Monday, February 17.
During the February 15th game against Troy, R. J. Hunter made his 1,000th career point, the third-fastest to reach the mark in school history.
During the February 17th game against Texas State, Ryan Harrow made his 1,000th career point, the second-fastest to reach the mark in school history (edging R. J. out by one game).
During the February 20th game against ULM, Manny Atkins made his 1,000th career point.

Roster

Schedule

|-
!colspan=9 style="background:#003399; color:#FFFFFF;"| Exhibition

|-
!colspan=9 style="background:#003399; color:#FFFFFF;"| Regular season

|-
!colspan=9 style="background:#003399; color:#FFFFFF;"| Sun Belt tournament

|-
!colspan=9 style="background:#003399; color:#FFFFFF;"| NIT

References

Georgia State Panthers men's basketball seasons
Georgia State
Georgia State
2013 in sports in Georgia (U.S. state)
2014 in sports in Georgia (U.S. state)